Hero MotoCorp Limited (formerly Hero Honda) is an Indian multinational motorcycle and scooter manufacturer headquartered in New Delhi. The company is one of the largest two-wheeler manufacturers in the world, as well as in India, where it has a market share of about 37.1% in the two-wheeler industry.

History
Hero Honda started its operations in 1984 as a joint venture between Hero Cycles of India and Honda of Japan. In June 2012, Hero MotoCorp approved a proposal to merge the investment arm of its parent Hero Investment Pvt. Ltd. with the automaker. This decision came 18 months after its split from Hero Honda.

"Hero" is the brand name used by the Munjal brothers for their flagship company, Hero Cycles Ltd. A joint venture between the Hero Group and Honda Motor Company was established in 1984 as the Hero Honda Motors Limited at Dharuhera, India. Munjal family and the Honda group both owned a 26% stake in the company.

During the 1980s, the company introduced motorcycles that were popular in India for their fuel economy and low cost. A popular advertising campaign based on the slogan 'Fill it – Shut it – Forget it' that emphasized the motorcycle's fuel efficiency helped the company grow at a double-digit pace since its inception. In 2001, the company became the largest two-wheeler manufacturing company in India and globally. It maintains global industry leaders to date. The technology in the bikes of Hero Motocorp (earlier Hero Honda) for almost 26 years (1984–2010) has come from the Japanese counterpart Honda.

Termination of Honda joint venture and the renaming

By December 2010, the board of directors of the Hero Honda Group had decided to terminate the joint venture between Hero Group of India and Honda of Japan in a phased manner. The Hero Group would buy out the 26% stake of the Honda in JV Hero Honda. Under the joint venture, Hero Group could not export to international markets (except Nepal, Bangladesh and Sri Lanka) and the termination would mean that Hero Group could now export. From the beginning, the Hero Group relied on their Japanese partner Honda for technology.

Honda exited the joint venture through a series of off-market transactions by giving the Munjal family, which held a 26% stake in the company. The discount was between 30% and 50% to the current value of Honda's stake as per the price of the stock after the market closed on 16 December 2010.

The rising differences between the two partners gradually emerged as an irritant. Differences had been brewing for a few years before the split over a variety of issues, ranging from Honda's reluctance to fully and freely share technology with Hero (despite a 10-year technology tie-up that expired in 2014) as well as Indian partner's uneasiness over high royalty payouts to the Japanese company. Another major irritant for Honda was the refusal of Hero Honda, (mainly managed by the Munjal family), to merge the company's spare parts business with Honda's new fully owned subsidiary, HMSI.

As per the arrangement, it was a two-leg deal: In the first part, the Munjal family, led by Brijmohan Lal Munjal group, formed an overseas-incorporated special purpose vehicle (SPV) to buy out Honda's entire stake, which was backed by bridge loans. This SPV was eventually opened for private equity participation, and those included Warburg Pincus, Kohlberg Kravis Roberts (KKR), TPG, Bain Capital and Carlyle Group.

Formation of the new company
The name of the company was changed from Hero Honda Motors Limited to Hero MotoCorp Limited on 29 July 2011. The new brand identity and logo of Hero MotoCorp were developed by the British firm Wolff Olins. The logo was revealed on 9 August 2011 in London, to coincide with the third test match between England and India.

Hero MotoCorp can now export to Latin America, Africa, and West Asia. Hero is free to use any vendor for its components instead of just Honda-approved vendors.

On 21 April 2014, Hero MotoCorp announced its plan on a  joint venture with Bangladesh's Nitol-Niloy Group in the next five years to set up a manufacturing plant in Bangladesh. The plant started production in 2017 under the name "HMCL Niloy Bangladesh Limited". Hero MotoCorp owns 55% of the manufacturing company and the rest 45% is owned by Niloy Motors (A subsidiary of Nitol-Niloy Group).  Hero also updated its 100cc engine range in 2014 for 110cc bikes except for Hero Dawn.

Equity investments

In July 2013, HMC acquired 49.2% shareholding in Erik Buell Racing, a motorcycle sport company which produced street and racing motorcycles based in East Troy, Wisconsin, United States.

HMC invested 205 crores (US$30.5 million) as a Series B round of funding in October 2016 and gained a 32.31% stake in Ather Energy, a start-up company manufacturing electric scooters. It invested a further 130 crores (US$19 million) in 2018. HMC's share in Ather Energy has grown up to 34.58% since 2016.

Operations
Hero MotoCorp has five manufacturing facilities based at Dharuhera, Gurugram, Neemrana, Haridwar and Halol . A new manufacturing facility is in the process of being set up in Chittoor in Andhra Pradesh. Spread over 600 acres, the company has invested 1600 crores in setting up this greenfield facility. These plants together have a production capacity of over 76 lakh (7.6 million) 2-wheelers per year. Hero MotoCorp has a sales   and service network with over 6,000 dealerships and service points across India. It has had a customer loyalty program since 2000, called the Hero Honda Passport Program which is now known as Hero GoodLife Program. As of 31 March 2020, the company has an annual capacity of 9.1 million units in its eight manufacturing facilities. Apart from these manufacturing facilities the company also has two R&D facilities, in Germany & Jaipur.

It is reported that Hero MotoCorp has five joint ventures or associate companies, Munjal Showa, AG Industries, Sunbeam Auto, Rockman Industries, and Satyam Auto Components, that supply a majority of its components.

As of March 2013, the company has sold over 7 crores (70 million) of 2-wheelers since its inception in 1984. It sold 60.7 lahks (6.07 million) 2-wheelers in 2012, out of which 55 lakh (5.5 million) were motorcycles. Hero MotoCorp sells more two-wheelers than the second, third, and fourth-placed two-wheeler companies put together. Its most popular bike, the Hero Splendor sells more than 10 lakh units per year.

This is in conjunction with new countries where they can now market their two-wheelers following the disengagement from Honda. Hero MotoCorp hopes to achieve 10% of its revenues from international markets, and they expected to launch sales in Nigeria by end-2011 or early 2012. Hero MotoCorp launched XPulse 200 adventure motorcycle in India on 1 May 2019, along with the XPulse 200T touring motorcycle.

In 2019, Hero MotoCorp sold more than 78 lahks (7.8 million) units, the highest of any two-wheeler company in the world. It registered its best-ever monthly performance by selling 7,69,000 units in September 2018. The company registered its best-ever quarterly performance in the April - June 2018 quarter (non-festive time) by selling more than 21 lahks (2.1 million) units.

In January 2021, Hero MotoCorp's production exceeded 100 million. As of 2021, Hero is the only Indian automobile brand to exceed 100 million in production. In February 2021, Hero MotoCorp sold 484,405 units with 0.9 percent growth.

Hero MotoCorp has launched an online virtual showroom.

Listings and shareholding
The equity shares of Hero MotoCorp are listed on the Bombay Stock Exchange, and the National Stock Exchange of India, where it is a constituent of the NIFTY 50.

As on 31 December 2013, the promoters Munjal Family held around 40% equity shares in Hero MotoCorp. Over 6b1,000 individual shareholders hold approx. 7.44% of its shares. Foreign Institutional Investors hold approx. 30% shares in the company.

Employees
As of 31 March 2014, the company had 6,782 employees, out of which 66 were women (1.1%). It also had approx. 13,800 temporary employees on that date. The company had an attrition rate of 5.1% in the FY 2012–13. The company spent  on employee benefits during the FY 2012–13.

Awards and recognition
 The 2006 Forbes list of the 200 World's Most Respected Companies had Hero Honda Motors ranked at No. 108.
 The Brand Trust Report published by Trust Research Advisory has ranked Hero Honda in the 7th position among the most trusted brands in India.

Initiatives
The company started Raman Kant Munjal Foundation (RKMF), in 1992 when it was known as Hero Honda Motors Ltd., which looks after:
 Raman Munjal Vidya Mandir (Educational Institution)
 BML Munjal University

During the financial year, the company spent ₹1.4 crores) on corporate social responsibility.

Sponsorship

Hero has been the sponsor of the Caribbean Premier League, a twenty-20 cricket franchise, since 2018. Hero also sponsors India's top men's football leagues (Indian Super League and I-League), I-League Qualifiers, Futsal Club Championship, women's top-tier Indian Women's League, Senior NFC for Santosh Trophy, Super Cup, Youth League and previously Federation Cup. They are also the principal sponsors of all India national and developmental football team kits. Since 2014, Hero has sponsored the Hero World Challenge golf tournament. Hero also sponsors two British events on the Golf European Tour: English Open (known as the Hero Open) and the Betfred British Masters.

Allegations of tax evasion 
In March 2022, the Income tax department conducted raids on offices and several other locations of Hero MotoCorp. Following this, the department stated in a report that the two-wheeler giant had made bogus claims of expenses to the tune of Rs 1000 crore.

See also 
 Ather Energy
 Bajaj Auto
 Okinawa Autotech
 Ola Electric
 TVS Motor Company
 List of companies of India

References

Vehicle manufacturing companies established in 1984
Companies based in New Delhi
Manufacturing companies based in Delhi
Motorcycle manufacturers of India
Indian brands
NIFTY 50
Indian companies established in 1984
Electric vehicle manufacturers of India
Hero Group
1984 establishments in Delhi
Companies listed on the National Stock Exchange of India
Companies listed on the Bombay Stock Exchange
Multinational companies headquartered in India